Wordplay  is a film website created in 1997 by screenwriters Ted Elliott and Terry Rossio. It was one of the first websites run by professional film writers with the goal of sharing the techniques of their craft. At the time, Elliott and Rossio had only four produced film credits, of which only Disney's Aladdin was a commercial and critical success. Since then, the pair have received an Oscar nomination and written several of the decade's top-grossing films, making them one of Hollywood's most successful writer teams, but they have managed to find the time for continued participation in the site.

The site features: columns by Rossio (and occasionally Elliott) on the business and craft of screenwriting; guest columns by industry professionals such as Frank Darabont, Walter Parkes, Zak Penn and Stephen King; and a discussion board open to industry professionals and aspiring writers alike. Notable participants in the discussion board have included Charles Pogue, Josh Olson, and Cheryl Heuton.

External links 
 Wordplayer.com

American film websites
Internet properties established in 1997